Deon Terry Anderson (born January 27, 1983) is a former American football fullback in the National Football League (NFL) for the Dallas Cowboys and Miami Dolphins. He was drafted in the sixth round of the 2007 NFL Draft by the Dallas Cowboys. He played college football at the University of Connecticut.

Early years
Anderson attended Portsmouth Abbey School, before he was expelled because of a campus incident. He transferred to Hope High School after his sophomore season, where he spent one year. He played football, basketball and was a track and field, honing his running skills under the legendary Hope High School track coach Thom Spann.

He transferred after his junior season to Avon Old Farms Prep, where he spent 2 years and was a three-sport letterman. In football, he was a two-way payer, receiving All-New England and All-Conference honors as a linebacker. He began wrestling as a senior and was named an All-American, winning the state and New England titles as a junior.

College career
Anderson accepted a football scholarship from the University of Connecticut to play linebacker. As a true freshman, he was converted into a fullback and became an immediate starter. He played on all four special teams units (kickoff return and cover, punt return and cover). He collected 34 carries for 11 yards, one rushing touchdown and 5 receptions for 12 yards.

As a sophomore in 2003, he was used mostly for blocking purposes in the offense. He started 5 out of 12 games, registering 35 carries for 124 yards, 15 receptions for 148 yards, one receiving touchdown and 11 special teams tackles.

As a junior in 2004, he started 3 out of 12 games, tallying 22 carries for 99 yards, 14 receptions for 133 yards and 11 special teams tackles.

Anderson missed the 2005 season, after losing his football scholarship because of poor grades and off-the-field problems, which forced him to drop out of school.

As a senior in 2006, he returned after a year out of football, under the condition that he would pay all of his college expenses, so he took out a loan with the help of an aunt and lived during a semester in an abandoned locker room on the campus, until he was able to gain back his scholarship. He started 9 out of 11 games, while receiving team MVP honors and was recognized as one of the best special teams players in the nation. He suffered a pinched nerve in his neck that forced him to miss the season finale against the No. 7 ranked University of Louisville. He posted 23 carries for 78 yards, 14 receptions for 101 yards, one touchdown and led the team with 9 special teams tackles. 

He finished his college career after appearing in 47 games, starting all of the 26 contests that the team opened with a fullback personnel package. He registered 114 carries for 420 yards, one rushing touchdown, 48 receptions for 394 yards and 3 receiving touchdowns. He also led the team in special teams tackles in each of his four years (40 total tackles) and only missed one game.

Professional career

Dallas Cowboys
Anderson was selected in the sixth round of the 2007 NFL Draft, after the Dallas Cowboys traded up with the Cleveland Browns moving from the 200th to the 195th position, in exchange for a seventh round draft choice (#234-Syndric Steptoe). He was expected to be a difference maker on special teams and was given the nickname "cricket" after eating an insect on a dare during training camp.

As a rookie, he was named the starter at fullback in the third game of the season, replacing an injured Oliver Hoyte. He was placed on the injured reserve list after suffering a rotator cuff injury in the eighth game.

On September 17, 2008, he had his knee scoped and missed two games because of the injury.

On August 13, 2009, he had surgery on his left knee. He was forced to sat out all of the preseason games, but did not miss any regular season contests after returning on September 7. He started 10 games and had no carries, while making 12 special teams tackles (tied for fourth on the team).

On September 16, 2010, he underwent arthroscopic knee surgery after being diagnosed with a torn meniscus. He was waived injured on September 24 and replaced with undrafted free agent Chris Gronkowski.

Miami Dolphins
On October 19, 2010, Anderson was signed by the Miami Dolphins as a free agent. He was placed on the injured reserve list with a triceps injury just 12 days after signing his contract. He was waived on March 3, 2011.

Personal life
On June 1, 2013, Anderson won the Heavyweight Championship for the Real Cage Fighting Mixed Martial Arts (MMA) organization. He also won a major food eating competition.

References

External links
Keep An Eye On Deon

1983 births
Living people
Players of American football from Providence, Rhode Island
American football fullbacks
UConn Huskies football players
Dallas Cowboys players
Miami Dolphins players
Portsmouth Abbey School alumni
Avon Old Farms alumni